The 2017–18 Serbian Cup season was the twelfth season of the Serbian national football cup competition. It was started in September 2017, and ended on 23 May 2018. Partizan won the tournament for the sixth time, extending their record as the club with the most wins.

Calendar

Preliminary round

Round of 32

Round of 16

Quarter-finals

Semi-finals

First legs

Second legs

Final

References

External links
 Official site

Serbian Cup seasons
Cup
Serbian Cup